Distant Early Warning may refer to:

Distant Early Warning Line, a series of radar stations in the Arctic, operated during the Cold War by the United States, Canada, Greenland and Iceland
"Distant Early Warning" (song), a song by the Canadian rock band Rush